Coalsnaughton or Calibar (Scottish Gaelic: Caolas Neachdainn) is a village in Clackmannanshire, Scotland. It is just south of Tillicoultry of which it also lies in its parish. The miners' row was built by Robert Bald.

References

Mining communities in Scotland
Villages in Clackmannanshire